Statistics of Primera División de México in season 1903–04.

Overview
1903-04 was the first season when the Mexican championship was played under a normal league system. Defending champions Orizaba only managed to place fourth. The new champions were Mexico Cricket Club San Pedro de los Pinos, who from 1894 to 1903 had played under the name Mexican National Cricket Club. This club was founded in the small town San Pedro de los Pinos, which now lies in the outskirts of Mexico City. The line-up of Mexico's second national champions, which was mainly British, included the three brothers Bruce, "Jack" and Walter Willy.

League standings

Top goalscorers
Players sorted first by goals scored, then by last name.

References

Mexico - List of final tables (RSSSF)

1903-04
Mex
1903–04 in Mexican football